Butyraldehyde, also known as butanal, is an organic compound with the formula CH3(CH2)2CHO. This compound is the aldehyde derivative of butane. It is a colorless flammable liquid with an unpleasant smell. It is miscible with most organic solvents.

Production
Butyraldehyde is produced almost exclusively by the hydroformylation of propylene:
 CH3CH=CH2 + H2 + CO → CH3CH2CH2CHO
Traditionally, hydroformylation was catalyzed by cobalt carbonyl and later rhodium complexes of triphenylphosphine.  The dominant technology involves the use of rhodium catalysts derived from the water-soluble ligand tppts. An aqueous solution of the rhodium catalyst converts the propylene to the aldehyde, which forms a lighter immiscible phase. About 6 billion kilograms are produced annually by hydroformylation. Butyraldehyde can be produced by the catalytic dehydrogenation of n-butanol.  At one time, it was produced industrially by the catalytic hydrogenation of crotonaldehyde, which is derived from acetaldehyde.

Reactions
Butyraldehyde undergoes reactions typical of alkyl aldehydes, and these define many of the uses of this compound.  Important reactions include hydrogenation to the alcohol, oxidation to the acid, and base-catalyzed condensation.

Uses
Aldol condensation in the presence of a base forms 2-ethyl-2-hexenal, which is then hydrogenated to form 2-ethylhexanol, a precursor to the plasticizer bis(2-ethylhexyl) phthalate.

Butyraldehyde is a precursor in the two-step synthesis of trimethylolpropane, which is used for the production of alkyd resins.

References

External links

Flavors
Aldehydes
Foul-smelling chemicals